Karnataka I solar park is a 40.5 megawatt (MWDC) photovoltaic power station. It is located at Chikkoppa Village in the Koppal District of the Indian state of Karnataka. It was commissioned in January 2018. The solar park is operated by Talettutayi Solar Projects One Private Limited and was constructed using 125,080 solar modules. The solar power from the plant is taken by Solar Energy Corporation of India (SECI).

The developer is Solar Arise India Projects Limited, which the shareholders are Thomas Lloyd Group, the European Initiative on Clean, Renewable Energy, Energy Efficiency and Climate Change related to Development SICAV SIF in relation to Global Energy Efficiency and Renewable Energy Fund (“GEEREF”), advised by the European Investment Bank Group, Kotak Mahindra managed Core Infrastructure India Fund (“CIIF”) and the founding management team Anil Nayar, James Abraham and Tanya Singhal. SolarArise owns and operates 130 MW of grid-connected solar power projects in India.

Solar power in India 
India targets developing 40 gigawatts of solar power plants and an additional 60 gigawatts in local generation by 2022.

References

External links
 Thomas Lloyd
 Solar Arise

Photovoltaic power stations in India
Mahbubnagar district
2016 establishments in Karnataka
Power stations in Karnataka